Apaw-ye Kyun or Apaw Ye Kyun is an island off the coast of Rakhine State, Burma.

Geography

See also
List of islands of Burma

References

External links
Why Kitesurfing Could Soon Soar in Myanmar

Islands of Myanmar
Rakhine State
Mud volcanoes